Irfan Raditya (born 12 June 1988 in Medan) is an Indonesian footballer who is currently playing for Persikabo. His former clubs include Arema Indonesia. and the Indonesian national football team. He was recruited from PSDS. He played for the national team U-20 in the AFF U-20 Cup in Palembang from 5–19 August 2005.

Achievements
2010 Liga Indonesia champions with Arema
2010 Piala Indonesia runners up with Arema

References

External links

1988 births
Living people
Indonesian footballers
Sportspeople from Medan
Persiraja Banda Aceh players
PSDS Deli Serdang players
Arema F.C. players
Pro Duta FC players
Mitra Kukar players
Liga 1 (Indonesia) players
Indonesian Super League-winning players
Association football central defenders